The London Underground is a metro system in the United Kingdom that serves Greater London and the home counties of Buckinghamshire, Essex and Hertfordshire. Its first section opened in 1863, making it the oldest underground metro system in the world – although approximately 55% of the current network is above ground, as it generally runs on the surface in outlying suburbs.  

The system is composed of eleven lines – Bakerloo, Central, Circle, District, Hammersmith & City, Jubilee, Metropolitan, Northern, Piccadilly, Victoria, and Waterloo & City – serving 272 stations. It is operated by Transport for London (TfL).

Most of the system is north of the River Thames, with six of the 32 London boroughs in the south of the city not served by the Underground. The London Borough of Hackney, to the north, has two stations on its border. Some stations at the north-eastern end of the Central line are in the Epping Forest district of Essex and some stations at the north-western end of the Metropolitan line are in the Three Rivers and Watford districts of Hertfordshire, and Buckinghamshire.

There are two instances where two separate stations share the same name: there is one Edgware Road station on the Circle, District, and Hammersmith & City lines and another Edgware Road on the Bakerloo line, and there is one Hammersmith station on the District and Piccadilly lines and another Hammersmith station on the Circle and Hammersmith & City lines. Although the Circle and Hammersmith & City lines station at Paddington is on the other side of the main line station to the Bakerloo, Circle and District lines station, it is shown as a single station on the current Tube map, but still counted as 2 in the official station count. It has been shown as two separate stations at different times in the past.

The opening of the Northern line extension to Battersea in September 2021 added two new stations to the network (Battersea Power Station and Nine Elms), bringing the total to 272.

Stations

Listed for each of the 273 stations are the lines serving it, local authority and the fare zone in which it is located, the date it and any earlier main line service opened, previous names and passenger usage statistics in millions per year.

Fictional stations

See also

 List of London railway stations
 List of Docklands Light Railway stations
 List of former and unopened London Underground stations
 List of busiest London Underground stations
 London Underground stations that are listed buildings
 Timeline of the London Underground

Notes
* Where more than one line serves a station, lines are listed in the order of opening. In some cases stations were first served by one underground line but later transferred to another:
a  First served by Metropolitan line – Circle line services separately identified in 1949.
b  First served by Metropolitan line – Circle line services separately identified in 1949, Hammersmith & City line services separately identified in 1990.
c  First served by Metropolitan line – District line service added in stages, Circle line services separately identified in 1949.
d  First served by Metropolitan line – Hammersmith & City line services separately identified in 1990.
e  First served by Metropolitan line – service transferred to Bakerloo line in 1939 and then to the Jubilee line in 1979.
f  First served by Metropolitan line – Bakerloo line service added in 1939 which was transferred to the Jubilee line in 1979.
g  First served by Bakerloo line – service transferred to Jubilee line in 1979.
h  First served by District line – service transferred to Piccadilly line in 1933.
i  First served by District line – Circle line services separately identified in 1949.
j  First served by District line – Metropolitan line service added in stages which was transferred to Hammersmith & City line in 1990.
k  First served by Metropolitan line – District line service added in 1910 which was transferred to Piccadilly line in 1933.
l  First served by District line – service transferred to Piccadilly line in 1964.
m  First served by Metropolitan line – Hammersmith & City line services separately identified in 1990, Circle line service added in 2009.
n   First served by Bakerloo line – service withdrawn in 1982.
† Some stations are assigned to multiple zones. People travelling through these stations may treat the station as in whatever zone makes their fare the least expensive.

References

Further reading

External links

 Tube – Transport for London
 

Busiest London Underground stations
London
 
Underground Stations